Lee Adams (born August 27, 1970) is a London based performance artist, curator and experimental film maker. Much of his work has been influenced by the ideas of French dissident surrealist and philosopher Georges Bataille.

Life and work

Adams studied Fine Art at The Ruskin School of Drawing and Fine Art, University of Oxford (1989–1992) under Professor Brian Catling.
He has performed and exhibited extensively in London and internationally in Milan, Athens, Belfast, Paris, Bordeaux, Lausanne, Berlin, Tallinn, Vilnius, Copenhagen, Sydney, Houston, New York City, San Francisco, Los Angeles and Mexico City.

In 2003 he performed The Language of Flowers for Visions of Excess, an eighteen-hour event inspired by Georges Bataille’s book of collected early essays (1927–1939), featuring Udo Kier, Bruce LaBruce, Slava Mogutin and Kembra Pfahler, curated by Ron Athey & Vaginal Davis for Fierce! Festival. He performed with Guillermo Gómez-Peña at Tate Modern.

In 2006 he collaborated with Athey to curate The Monster in the Night of the Labyrinth, commissioned by The Hayward Gallery, London as part of the exhibition Undercover Surrealism, Georges Bataille & Documents.

This was followed by a series of collaborative events with Athey including Re-Visions of Excess for the finale of the 10th anniversary of Fierce! Festival in 2007, Visions of Excess at SHUNT Vaults, London, commissioned by the SPILL Festival of Performance in 2009 and A History of Ecstasy (2009) alongside Othon Mataragas, Ernesto Tomasini, Vaginal Davis, Julie Tolentino, Mouse and Pigpen at the Museo d'Arte Contemporanea Donna Regina (MADRE) Naples, as part of the Napoli Teatro Festival Italia.

He later performed in London for Panic, curated by Guerrilla Zoo at the Old Abattoir, alongside works by the founders of Mouvement Panique - Alejandro Jodorowsky and Roland Topor and in Copenhagen for Visions of Excess at the International Festival of Performance Art alongside Kira O'Reilly, Dominic Johnson, Lazlo Pearlman and Mouse at Warehouse 9.

He presented Through A Glass Darkly, a retrospective lecture covering his early experimental films and more recent documented performance at the London Underground Film Festival, hosted by the Horse Hospital London in December 2010.

Notes

References 
 Visions of Excess reviewed by Joao Florencio and SPILL Performance Tarot photographed by Manuel Vason, Volume 23, in Dance Theatre Journal published by Laban.   2010
 SPILL Festival Of Performance: On Agency.  2010
 Lusus Naturae: Porca Miseria and the Spectacle of Shamelessness.  Article by Lee Adams, image Rafael Perez-Evans, digital operator Monka Elkelv.  Published in Stimulus Respond Journal, Circus edition.  Edited by Jack Boulton.  2010
 Visions of Excess reviewed by Michele Occelli.  2009
 NYC Go-Go Photographs from Lee Adams performance of Bestiary at The Cock, NYC in November 2007, published in Slava Mogutin's monograph NYC Go-Go (powerHouse Books) with and accompanying essay by Bruce Benderson.
 Encounters photographic/live art project with Manuel Vason & Empress Stah, published by Arnolfini Gallery, Bristol (photograph only). 2007
 Art Attack - The Pain Principal. 3 page interview by Denise Stanborough. Bizarre Magazine, October 2007.
 Epsilon Magazine Issue 867 - London Underground feature. Photograph by Socrates Mitsios.  2007
 The Monster in the Night of the Labyrinth reviewed by Kate Random-Love in Total Theatre Magazine, volume 18, issue 04.  2006
 The Monster in the Night of the Labyrinth reviewed by Dominic Johnson in Western European Stages, volume 19 Number 1.  Editor Marvin Carlson.  Published by Martin R. Segal Theater Center, The Graduate Center, The City University of New York.  2006
 Bindu Point documentation published in Body, Space, Technology Journal, volume 5.  Brunel University.  2005
 Live: Art, Performance and the Contemporary.  Edited by Adrian Heathfield and produced in collaboration with Tate Publishing.  (Photograph) courtesy of Hugo Glendinning (photograph only).  2004
 The Bachelor Stripped Bare reviewed by Professor Robert Ayers in Live Art Magazine.  2002
 Cruising Interview with Joan Bakewell and performance filmed for Taboo - 50 Years of Censorship BBC2 Television.  2001
 Government of the First & Thirteenth Chair; Re-staging of seminal work by John Latham to coincide with Latham’s retrospective at the Museum of Modern Art, Oxford, reviewed in Performance Research Magazine. 1992

External links 
 http://www.leeadams.net/LeeAdams/welcome.html

1970 births
Living people
British performance artists
British experimental filmmakers